Blackamoor is one village in Lancashire, England which is to the south of Blackburn. 

It is located on the cross roads between Lower Darwen and Guide where the B6231 crosses the old “Roman Road” from Manchester to Ribchester.

References

Villages in Lancashire
Geography of Blackburn with Darwen